Frank Davis (born 25 August 1944) is a former Australian rules footballer who played for Melbourne in the Victorian Football League (VFL).

Davis was educated at Salesian College, Chadstone. He made his debut in Melbourne's premiership winning season of 1964 and despite managing just six games he was a member of the grand final winning team in his rookie season. Davis started his career with a bang by kicking a goal with his first kick but then didn't manage another for eight years. Instead of a goal sneak he turned into a reliable defender off the half-back flank or in the back pocket. He was club captain from 1970 to 1972, earning their best and fairest award in his first season in charge. He also represented Victoria at interstate football during his career.

He served as an assistant coach to Carl Ditterich Melbourne in 1979 and has been credited as the senior coach for the Round 8, 1979 match where Ditterich was suspended.

He worked as country development officer with the Hawks between from 1982 to 1985, and as recruiting manager during four Hawthorn premierships between 1986 and 1995. In retirement, he still works in a casual recruiting role with the Hawks.

Playing statistics

|- style="background-color: #EAEAEA"
! scope="row" style="text-align:center" | 1964
|style="text-align:center;"|
| 40 || 6 || 1 ||  ||  ||  ||  ||  ||  || 0.2 ||  ||  ||  ||  ||  || 
|-
! scope="row" style="text-align:center" | 1965
|style="text-align:center;"|
| 6 || 18 || 0 || 1 || 183 || 14 || 197 || 35 ||  || 0.0 || 0.1 || 10.2 || 0.8 || 10.9 || 1.9 || 
|- style="background:#eaeaea;"
! scope="row" style="text-align:center" | 1966
|style="text-align:center;"|
| 6 || 13 || 0 || 0 || 115 || 6 || 121 || 33 ||  || 0.0 || 0.0 || 8.8 || 0.5 || 9.3 || 2.5 || 
|-
! scope="row" style="text-align:center" | 1967
|style="text-align:center;"|
| 6 || 17 || 0 || 0 || 195 || 14 || 209 || 44 ||  || 0.0 || 0.0 || 11.5 || 0.8 || 12.3 || 2.6 || 
|- style="background:#eaeaea;"
! scope="row" style="text-align:center" | 1968
|style="text-align:center;"|
| 6 || 16 || 0 || 0 || 187 || 16 || 203 || 32 ||  || 0.0 || 0.0 || 11.7 || 1.0 || 12.7 || 2.0 || 
|-
! scope="row" style="text-align:center" | 1969
|style="text-align:center;"|
| 6 || 16 || 0 || 0 || 218 || 19 || 237 || 43 ||  || 0.0 || 0.0 || 13.6 || 1.2 || 14.8 || 2.7 || 
|- style="background:#eaeaea;"
! scope="row" style="text-align:center" | 1970
|style="text-align:center;"|
| 6 || 22 || 0 || 0 || 303 || 22 || 325 || 70 ||  || 0.0 || 0.0 || 13.8 || 1.0 || 14.8 || 3.2 || 
|-
! scope="row" style="text-align:center" | 1971
|style="text-align:center;"|
| 6 || 21 || 0 || 0 || 286 || 36 || 322 || 60 ||  || 0.0 || 0.0 || 13.6 || 1.7 || 15.3 || 2.9 || 
|- style="background:#eaeaea;"
! scope="row" style="text-align:center" | 1972
|style="text-align:center;"|
| 6 || 21 || 0 || 1 || 261 || 33 || 294 || 68 ||  || 0.0 || 0.1 || 12.4 || 1.6 || 14.0 || 3.2 || 
|-
! scope="row" style="text-align:center" | 1973
|style="text-align:center;"|
| 6 || 18 || 1 || 0 || 174 || 18 || 192 || 34 ||  || 0.1 || 0.0 || 9.7 || 1.0 || 10.7 || 1.9 || 
|- class="sortbottom"
! colspan=3| Career
! 168
! 2
! 2
! 1922
! 178
! 2100
! 419
! 
! 0.0
! 0.0
! 11.9
! 1.1
! 13.0
! 2.6
! 
|}

References

External links

1944 births
Australian rules footballers from Victoria (Australia)
Melbourne Football Club players
Keith 'Bluey' Truscott Trophy winners
Living people
Melbourne Football Club captains
Melbourne Football Club Premiership players
One-time VFL/AFL Premiership players
People educated at Salesian College (Chadstone)